Henricosbornia is an extinct genus of henricosborniid notoungulate that lived from the Late Paleocene to the Middle Eocene of what is now Argentina and Brazil.

Description

This animal is mostly known from its fossilized teeth, and any reconstruction of it is therefore only hypothetical. The dentition of Henricosbornia was primitive in that it had no diastema, and the molars and premolars were low-crowned (brachydont). All the upper molars were triangular in section, and devoid of hypoconus. The crest of the trigonid was oblique, and the metaconid was higher than the protoconid. The entoconid was posterior, and took the form of a transversal crest. The species Henricosbornia lophodonta exhibits a large intraspecific variability in the metaloph morphology.

Classification

The genus Henricosbornia was first described in 1901 by Florentino Ameghino, based on fossil remains found in terrains dating from the Early Eocene of Argentina, in the Chubut Province. In a few years, Ameghino described numerous remains of teeth from the same area and considered them as belonging to various species of notoungulates, which he named Hericosbornia lophodonta (the type species), Hemistylops paucicuspidatus, Hemistylops trigonostyloides, Pantostylops completus, Microstylops monoconus, Prohyracotherium patagonicum, Microstylops clarus, Selenoconus spiculatus, Prohyracotherium matutinum. The generic name is derived from the famous paleontologist Henry Fairfield Osborn. All these species were later identified as Henricosbornia lophodonta by George Gaylord Simpson, who identified the numerous dental remains as intraspecific variations.

Several other species were attributed to the genus, some of them still considered valid; Henricosbornia ampla, the youngest species, was found in deposits dating to the Middle Eocene as well as H. minuta. One of the species described by Ameghino in 1901, Pantostylops typus, may have been a distinct species of Henricosbornia. Fossils attributed to the genus were also discovered in slightly more ancient, Late Paleocene terrains of Argentina.

Given its archaic characteristics, Henricosbornia is considered to be one of the most basal notoungulates. It is the eponymous genus of Henricosborniidae, a family including the most basal notoungulates, and classically associated with the Notostylopidae within the probably paraphyletic suborder Notioprogonia. It is related to Nanolophodon.

References

F. Ameghino. 1901. Notices préliminaires sur des ongulés nouveaux des terrains crétacés de Patagonie [Preliminary notes on new ungulates from the Cretaceous terrains of Patagonia]. Boletin de la Academia Nacional de Ciencias de Córdoba 16:349-429
F. Ameghino. 1904. Nuevas especies de mamíferos, cretáceos y terciarios de la República Argentina [New species of mammals, Cretaceous and Tertiarty, from the Argentine Republic]. Anales de la Sociedad Cientifica Argentina 56–58:1-142
G. G. Simpson. 1935. Descriptions of the oldest known South American mammals, from the Rio Chico Formation. American Museum Novitates 793:1-25

Notoungulates
Paleocene mammals of South America
Eocene mammals of South America
Mustersan
Casamayoran
Itaboraian
Riochican
Peligran
Paleogene Argentina
Paleogene Brazil
Fossils of Argentina
Fossils of Brazil
Fossil taxa described in 1901
Taxa named by Florentino Ameghino
Prehistoric placental genera
Itaboraí Formation
Golfo San Jorge Basin
Sarmiento Formation